This article shows the rosters of all participating teams at the 2016 AVC Cup for Men in Nakhon Pathom, Thailand.

Pool A

The following is the Thai roster in the 2016 AVC Cup for Men.

Head coach: Monchai Supajirakul

The following is the Chinese roster in the 2016 AVC Cup for Men.

Head coach: Li Mu

The following is the Kazakhstani roster in the 2016 AVC Cup for Men.

 Head coach: Igor Nikolchenko

The following is the Taiwanese roster in the 2016 AVC Cup for Men.

 Head coach: Chen Ke-chou

Pool B

The following is the Japanese roster in the 2016 AVC Cup for Men.

Head coach: Shingo Sakai

The following is the Iranian roster in the 2016 AVC Cup for Men.

Head coach: Nasser Shahnazi

The following is the Australian roster in the 2016 AVC Cup for Men.

Head Coach: Roberto Santilli

The following is the Korean roster in the 2016 AVC Cup for Men.

 Head coach: Kim Nam-sung

External links
Official website
Team composition

Asian
Asian volleyball championships men's squads